Erik Nash is a three time Oscar nominated visual effects artist.

In addition he has won two Emmys for his work on Star Trek: The Next Generation.

Oscar history
All three are in the category of Best Visual Effects

77th Academy Awards-Nominated for I, Robot, nomination shared with Andrew R. Jones, Joe Letteri and John Nelson. Lost to Spider-Man 2.
84th Academy Awards-Nominated for Real Steel, nomination shared with Swen Gillberg, Danny Gordon Taylor and John Rosengrant. Lost to Hugo.
86th Academy Awards-Nominated for Iron Man 3, nomination shared with Dan Sudick, Christopher Townsend and Guy Williams. Lost to Gravity.

References

External links

Living people
Special effects people
Year of birth missing (living people)
Place of birth missing (living people)
Emmy Award winners